Minuscule 145 (in the Gregory-Aland numbering), ε 101 (Soden), is a Greek minuscule manuscript of the New Testament, on parchment leaves. Paleographically it has been assigned to the 11th century. It has full marginalia.

Description 

The codex contains the text of the Gospel of Luke and Gospel of John on 161 thick parchment leaves (size ), with some lacunae (Luke 4:15-5:36; John 1:1-26).

The text is written in one column per page, 17 lines per page. There is also another division according to the smaller Ammonian Sections, whose numbers are given at the margin, with references to the Eusebian Canons (written below Ammonian Section numbers).

The text of Luke 17-21 has many corrections made by the hand of Presbyter Nikolaus.

Text 

The Greek text of the codex is a representative of the Byzantine text-type. Hermann von Soden classified it to the textual family Kx. Kurt Aland did not place it in any Category. According to the Claremont Profile Method it represents Πa in Luke 1 and Luke 10. In Luke 20 it has mixed text.

The spurious text of John 5:4 is marked by an obelus. The Pericope Adulterae (John 7:53-8:11) has annotation that many manuscripts do not contain this pericope.

History 

The manuscript was presented by Maximilian of Bavarian to Urban VIII, a Pole (1623–1644).

It was examined by Bianchini, Birch (about 1782), and Scholz. C. R. Gregory saw the manuscript in 1886.

It is currently housed at the Vatican Library (Vat. gr. 1548), at Rome.

See also 

 List of New Testament minuscules
 Biblical manuscript
 Textual criticism

References

Further reading 

 

Greek New Testament minuscules
11th-century biblical manuscripts
Manuscripts of the Vatican Library